Talk Back and You're Dead is a 2014 Filipino romantic comedy-action film directed by Andoy Ranay, topbilled by James Reid, Nadine Lustre and Joseph Marco. It is based on the bestselling novel of the same name originally published on Wattpad by Alesana Marie. The film was distributed by Viva Films Skylight Films & Star Cinema and was released on August 20, 2014, in theaters nationwide.

Plot

A boy and girl in costumes promise each other that they will someday marry. In the present day, Miracle Samantha Perez is inside a bookstore, and she notices her friend Michie confronting Timothy Odelle "Top" Pendleton with his girlfriend outside. Samantha assumes Top is cheating on Michie and joins the scene. She slaps and insults him, and her friends drag her away from the scene. Inside the girls' comfort room, Michie and her other friends, China and Maggie, admit the scene with Top was only a playtime because they want Hershey to break up with Top. At home, Samantha's scene with Top goes viral on the internet. While taking up an exam later, Samantha receives a call from Top, but she curses him when greeted rudely, resulting in her phone being confiscated by her teacher. Top tries calling again, but the teacher answers instead and ends up cursing each other again. Top arrives with his gang at St. Celestine to abduct Samantha where Jared "Red" Dela Cruz brings her to a night club. At the night club, Top asks Samantha to date him but she refuses. In the middle of their argument, Piggy's gang arrives and starts a fight. Top is badly hurt after the fight and Samantha worries about his condition. She asks a doctor of Top's condition, and mistakenly believes that he has a brain cancer and will die. Samantha agrees to be his girlfriend, then Top admits he will not die. Samantha realizes this and intends to leave him but is threatened by Top to try to avoid him. Samantha also discovers that Top is not a common gangster but the leader of the Lucky 13, the most notorious gang of the district. At the mall, Top breaks up with Hershey and introduces Samantha as his new girlfriend. Back at school, Samantha hears some rumors that Red's sister, Audrey Dela Cruz, has a gangster boyfriend from Pendleton High named Top. Piggy's gang abducts Audrey as they mistake her for Top's girlfriend in order to lure him to their hideout, but Top overpowers Piggy's gang and saves Audrey. Top confronts Samantha if she gave Piggy the information that Audrey was his girlfriend in which she denies. He warns Samantha to be careful and not to get caught.

Samantha believes that Top is just playing on her, so she confronts Audrey. Meanwhile, at dinner, Top told his parents that he already has a girlfriend and he will invite her for tomorrow dinner. Top picks up Samantha from school and brings her to his house for dinner with his family, but the dinner ends up with Top and his father arguing about the death of Top's mother. That night, Top breaks up with Samantha because she was too perfect for him, but Samantha has already fallen in love with him. Samantha is badly hurt that Top broke up with her, then Audrey told her that Top was an ex-convict. After school, Samantha was abducted by Piggy's gang in order to avenge. Top and his gang arrives at Piggy's hideout and start fighting where they overpower Piggy's gang. Samantha calls Top an ex-convict and he was stunned of what he heard, as Red takes Samantha home telling her that Top is not really a bad guy and it was the second time that Top saves her as the first was a mistaken identity caused by Samantha. Samantha invites Top to a date to make peace of what she has said. At Pendleton High, Top humiliates Samantha in front of everyone for being present at their basketball game. Top apologizes to Samantha for humiliating her at his school then Top confesses his true feelings for Samantha and they become officially lovers. At a theme park, Top gives Samantha a teddy bear which he got from Audrey's date after the guy verbally harassed Samantha which angered Top and knocks down the guy unconscious. Samantha and Audrey finally make peace of their dislike toward each other. Top went to the guy who stole Samantha's teddy bear to bring it back to her and beats the guy. Top and Red went to Samantha's house to give back the teddy bear but Top was surprised when he saw Lee, Samantha's cousin. Top asks Lee why he lied to him in believe that Sammy/Samantha was in Japan and Lee admits to him that Samantha was bound to a fixed marriage and he can never have Samantha. Upset on what he discovered, Top breaks up again with her but Samantha wanted Top to fight for them.

With no other options, Top and Samantha decide to live-in, far away from their families. They stay in Top's beach house for several days. Red and the rest of the gang arrives at the beach house as Red had a plan. Red told Samantha that her parents knows where she is and they intend to sue Top of kidnapping and rape since Samantha is still a minor that will cause a huge issue between the Perez and the Pendleton Group of Companies. Samantha decides to go home in order to save Top from being jailed. Back at home, Samantha's parents were so upset for what she has done and her parents told her that Top was ex-convicted for kidnapping. Shocked, Samantha confronts Top about it but she was surprised when he admits it. She also learns that the person he kidnapped was his girlfriend, who turns out to be his half-sister. She admits to Samantha that Top actually helped her to escape from his abusive father. Upset of what she heard, she goes to see Top at his mother's tombstone to apologize and Top introduces Samantha to his mother. Samantha discovers that Lee and his parents lied to him because they want her to marry another man.

The Perez family celebrated a special night announcing the marriage of their only heir, Samantha, to the eldest sibling of the Dela Cruz family, Red. Top goes to the party with blonde hair and hears that Samantha and Red are getting married. Samantha, mad that she will marry her boyfriend's best friend, tries to convince Red to refuse the marriage, as an angry Top confronts Red because of his betrayal to him. Samantha asks him to leave, with her ending up their relationship because no one can do anything. Samantha was told by her parents that they will be leaving for France together with Red. At St. Celestine, the Lucky 13 gang tells Samantha that Top is waiting outside before playing a live song performance. She goes outside and sees Top at his car apologizing that she can't do anything about the marriage but she still loves him promising that she will be back for him and Top replied to her that he is willing to wait for the day she returns and they kiss under the fireworks.

Two years later, Samantha receives a call from Audrey that Top got into an accident after he mysteriously vanished without anyone knowing. Samantha and Red return home and Samantha realizes that Top could be at his beach house. She goes to the beach house and she watches a video footage of a boy and a girl making promises to each other that they will be getting married someday, as seen in the beginning of the film. Meanwhile, Red admits to Audrey that he has fallen in love with Samantha. As Samantha recalls the lost memories of her past where she and Top made a promise to each other as children, a dog walks through and leads her to Top at the beach. Samantha sees his realization that he has lost his sight, and Top asks God for a miracle because he badly needs one. Samantha then hugs Top with tears of joy at their reunion.

Cast

 James Reid as Timothy "Top" Odelle Pendleton
 Nadine Lustre as Miracle Samantha "Sammy" Perez 
 Joseph Marco as Jared "Red" Dela Cruz
 Coraleen Waddell as Michie Sta. Maria
 Donnalyn Bartolome as China Dela Vega
 Rosalie Van Ginkel as Maggie Dela Vega
 Bret Jackson as Jacques "Jack" Maunnick
 Arkin Del Rosario as Seven Barasque
 Josh Padilla as Six Barasque
 Carlo Lazerna as Dos Cerventez
 Kiko Ramos as Philip "Pip" Morello
 King Certeza as Kyohei "Kyo" Sagara
 Aki Torio as Jun Morales
 Cliff Hogan as Romeo "Omi" D'Arrez
 Billy Villeta as Alvince "Vin" Montelegre
 Ryan Kevin as Mond Villaraza
 Clark Merced as Raine / Sun Montecillo
 Yassi Pressman as Audrey Dela Cruz
 Via Carillo as Aphrodite "Sweety" Pendleton
 Aj Muhlach as Lee Perez
 Candy Pangilinan as Selene Perez
 Bobby Andrews as Teddy Pendleton
 Cristopher Roxas as Crisostomo Perez
 Jana Victoria as Ginny Pendleton
 Isabelle Pressman as Aniya Marie "Amarie" du Courdrey

Production

Casting
According to the author of the novel, Joseph Marco is the perfect role for Timothy "Top" Pendleton but the producers instead gave Marco the character of Jared "Red" Dela Cruz.

Deleted scene
The scene where Samantha lost her other shoe after Top Pendleton fights the gang members who chased her. Jared carries her home. The clip wasn't featured in the actual movie but can be seen in the trailer. Another scene features Jared inviting Samantha on a date.

Soundtrack
The movie's soundtrack is entitled "Bahala Na" (Eng. Translation: Come What May), a duet featuring the two stars of the film, Nadine Lustre and James Reid.

Reception

Box office
According to the showbiz news reporter Ginger Conejero of TV Patrol, the film earned PHP 30 Million on its first 3 days of showing. Box Office Mojo places the total gross of PHP 76,941,733 as of September 14, 2014, second to the top-grosser Rurouni Kenshin. There has been no official release of the final box office gross from the film's production.

Critical response
Philbert Ortiz-Dy of Click the City gave a mixed review in the film, stating that "The film just feels hastily assembled, its only real purpose to provide another platform for the onscreen pairing of Nadine Lustre and James Reid [...] but the pair works best outside the machinations of the plot, when the movie simply gives them the room to linger in an intimate moment." He also stated that "Talk Back and You're Dead makes so little sense that it may as well be taking place in an entirely different universe. What starts out as a weird little tale of animosity growing into affection turns into a monster of melodramatic convolutions reliant on information that's mostly hidden from the audience."

Zig Marasigan of Rappler gave a negative review of the film, stating "Trying to make sense of Talk Back and You're Dead is very much like watching a snake eat its own tail. It's fascinatingly grotesque, watching a serpent devour itself from the outside. It slowly works towards its delicate innards, oblivious to its own demise. The snake eventually dies from its own gastric juices, and all you're left with is a reptilian corpse that is just too eager but too consumed to tell its tail from its meal. Talk Back and You're Dead doesn't have a horrible story, it simply doesn't have a story. But if a film like Talk Back and You're Dead can be produced and released without a need for story, who needs writers?"

Cancelled sequel
During the end credits, a clip from the sequel was shown and it is confirmed that there will be a sequel of this film, entitled Never Talk Back To A Gangster.

As of 2018, there is still no confirmation by the director or the production staff about the said sequel coming out.

See also
List of Philippine films based on Wattpad stories

References

External links
 
 

2014 films
2014 romantic comedy films
2014 action comedy films
2010s teen comedy films
Star Cinema films
2010s teen romance films
2010s Tagalog-language films
Philippine romantic comedy films
Philippine action comedy films
Philippine teen romance films
Skylight Films films
Viva Films films
Philippine gangster films
Films based on Philippine novels
2010s English-language films
Films directed by Andoy Ranay